The 2020–21 MPBL Playoffs was the postseason tournament of the 2019–20 MPBL season. This was the league's third overall, and the second post-season under a new format. The postseason tournament began on February 15, 2020 and concluded on March 21, 2021, after the fourth game of the 2021 MPBL Finals. The league suspended all the playoffs due to the COVID-19 outbreak in March 12, 2020. After a year of stoppage of play, the league got an approval from the IATF-EID and resumed the playoffs on March 10, 2021, inside a bubble hosted by Subic. The 2021 MPBL Finals saw the Northern Division champions San Juan Knights competed against the Southern Division champion Davao Occidental Tigers. The Tigers eventually won the championship after beating the Knights in four games, avenging their last season's finals loss in 2019. Mark Yee was named the Finals MVP for that finals series.

Overview 
 The defending champions, San Juan Knights, earned its second consecutive playoff appearance as the league's top seed, thus, holding the homecourt advantage throughout the playoffs.
 The last year's finalists, Davao Occidental Tigers, earned its second consecutive playoff appearance.
 For the Southern Division, the Basilan Steel, GenSan Warriors, Bicol Volcanoes and Iloilo United Royals all made their first playoff appearances.
 For the Northern Division, the Pampanga Giant Lanterns, Pasay Voyagers, Manila Stars, Makati Super Crunch and the Pasig Sta. Lucia Realtors all made their first postseason appearances.
 The Basilan Steel defeated the Bacoor City Strikers to qualify for their first-ever South Division Finals appearance.
 The Makati Super Crunch defeated the last year's North runners-up, Manila Stars to qualify for their first-ever North Division Finals appearance.
 The Game One of the South Division Semifinals between the Davao Occidental Tigers and the Zamboanga Family's Brand Sardines became a historic game, breaking several records. It was the game where both combined the least points in a single game, 75, surpassing the record held by Marikina and Cebu of 92 points. The Zamboanga team also set the newest record for the least points in a game with 28, 14 less than the Marikina Shoemasters. Also, both Davao and Zamboanga combined for the least points made in a half, with 30 points (19–11 halftime score).
 Almost exactly a year after the league suspended its play, the league is set to resume the playoffs starting at the do-or-die games of the Division Finals, on March 10, 2021, in a bio-secure bubble in Subic, followed by the best-of-five National Finals which will commence on March 17, 2021 at the same venue.
 The Davao Occidental Tigers won the national championship after defeating the San Juan Knights in Game 4 of the finals series in overtime, 89–88. Mark Yee was named as the Finals Most Valuable Player for that series.

Bracket 
Teams in bold advanced to the next round. The numbers to the left of each team indicate the team's seeding in its division, and the numbers to the right indicate the number of games the team won in that round. Teams with home court advantage, the higher seeded team, are shown in italics.

First round

Northern Division

(1) San Juan Knights vs. (8) Pasay Voyagers 

This is the first playoff meeting between the Knights and the Voyagers.

(2) Manila Stars vs. (7) Pasig Sta. Lucia Realtors 

This is the first playoff meeting between the Stars and the Realtors.

(3) Makati Super Crunch vs. (6) Bulacan Kuyas 

This is the first playoff meeting between the Kuyas and the Super Crunch.

(4) Pampanga Giant Lanterns vs. (5) Bataan Risers 

This is the first playoff meeting between the Giant Lanterns and the Risers.

Southern Division

(1) Davao Occidental Tigers vs. (8) Bicol Volcanoes 

This is the first playoff meeting between the Tigers and the Volcanoes.

(2) Bacoor City Strikers vs. (7) GenSan Warriors 

This is the second playoff meeting between these two teams, with the Strikers winning the first one.

(3) Basilan Steel vs. (6) Iloilo United Royals 

This is the first playoff meeting between the Steel and United Royals.

(4) Batangas City Athletics vs. (5) Zamboanga Family's Brand Sardines 

This is the second playoff meeting between these two teams, with the Athletics winning the first one.

Division Semifinals

Northern Division

(1) San Juan Knights vs. (4) Pampanga Giant Lanterns 

This is the first playoff meeting between the Knights and Lanterns.

(2) Manila Stars vs. (3) Makati Super Crunch 

This is the first playoff meeting between the Stars and the Super Crunch.

Southern Division

(1) Davao Occidental Tigers vs. (5) Zamboanga Family's Brand Sardines 

This is the first playoff meeting between the Tigers and the Valientes.

(2) Bacoor City Strikers vs. (3) Basilan Steel 

This is the first playoff meeting between the Steel and the Strikers.

Division Finals 
Both Game Threes of the Division Finals are suspended indefinitely due to the COVID-19 outbreak. Almost exactly after a year the league stopped play, the league will resume its play on March 10, 2021 in which the remaining games will be played via bubble in Subic. The league will be broadcasting the remaining games on A2Z Channel 11 and Kapamilya Channel after its former TV partner, ABS-CBN Sports was dissolved (ports division of ABS-CBN), due to failure to renew its broadcast franchise last 2020.

Northern Division Finals: (1) San Juan Knights vs. (3) Makati Super Crunch

Southern Division Finals: (1) Davao Occidental Tigers vs. (3) Basilan Steel 
The third game is postponed to a later date after a player from the Basilan Steel tested positive from COVID-19. The league gave an ultimatum to the entire Basilan team that should all of the swab tests of the players and the team officials return negative, the game three of the series shall be played on March 17, with the National Finals starting immediately next day, March 18, 2021. However, if even at least one swab test from the team comes back positive, then Davao Occidental will win the division title by default (2–0 final score for a defaulted game based on FIBA rules) and advance to the National Finals. 
On March 16, the league announced that there were an additional two members from the Basilan delegation that also caught positive with the virus, making it a total of four, and as a result, they awarded the Southern Division championship to the Tigers and advanced to the National Finals for the second consecutive season, setting up a rematch with the defending champions, San Juan Knights.

2021 MPBL Finals: (N1) San Juan Knights vs. (S1) Davao Occidental Tigers 

The San Juan Knights and the Davao Occidental Tigers competed in the MPBL Finals to determine the third MPBL Champions. This was the first championship series to be held entirely inside a bubble, hosted by Subic. The series was a rematch of the last season's finals between both teams, with San Juan winning last year's championship in five games. The Tigers avenged their last season's finals loss against the Knights, defeating them in four games to win the title.

This is the second finals meeting between the Knights and the Tigers, with the Knights winning the first one.

Notes

References 

Maharlika Pilipinas Basketball League
2020 in Philippine sport
MPBL Playoffs
MPBL Playoffs